OKJ may refer to:

KF3, or OK-Junior, a kart-racing class
Oakland – Jack London Square station, Oakland, California, US (Amtrak station code)
Okayama Airport, Okayama, Japan (IATA code)